Olle Emanuel Nordmark (May 25, 1890 – December 18, 1973) was a Swedish painter and muralist born in Nordanholen at Mockfjärd parish. He was focused on an art career from an early age. After emigrating in 1924 to the United States to gain more work opportunities, he lived there for 40 years. Living mostly in New York City, he produced numerous murals and frescos for private commissions. In 1964, he emigrated to France, where he lived until his death.

Biography
Nordmark started to draw and paint at an early age. His first teacher was his father, but in 1901 he met painter Gustaf Ankarcrona in Leksand, who taught him the basics. At the age of 15, Nordmark had decided that he was going to be an artist. He continued his studies at Althin's School of Painting in Stockholm, where he trained in fresco painting.

After his studies Nordmark created murals and decorative paintings for private homes and churches in Sweden. While working, he became more interested in creating theatrical scenery. In 1917 he traveled to Moscow to study theatrical scenery. The next year he returned to Stockholm, where he started to work with set designers and to create drawings for costumes. He worked for, among others, theatres such as Södra Teatern, Stora Teatern, the Folkan, the Oscars Teatern, and the Royal Swedish Opera.

Nordmark lived and worked in Stockholm until 1924. Meanwhile, he became a well-known and respected designer of stage sets. His works were very imaginative, beautiful and colorful. Nordmark worked also with Karl Gerhard on sets for 22 productions. 

During his time in Stockholm, he also worked as the head of Grabowska, a decorative painting workshop at Karlavägen. He arranged a number of displays in the news-office window of Svenska Dagbladet for clients such as Barnängen and Finbruken.

Nordmark decorated several churches, such as Engelbrektskyrkan, Saltsjöbadskyrkan, churches in Borås and Karlskrona, and the wedding hall in Stockholm Court House. In 1924 Nordmark provided helped restore the church in Mockfjärd, contributing his work for free (pro bono) because of his love for his homestead. The same year he started to paint a portrait of Gädd Lars Holmberg, which he finished in the US. He donated the painting to the church in Mockfjärd.

To acquire more knowledge within his field, he made several study trips on the European continent to nations including France, Germany, Italy, and Russia. In 1924 he emigrated to the United States to seek more work opportunities than Sweden could offer him. He lived there until 1964 when he moved to France.

In the United States his work was noticed by leading Broadway theater directors, and he created some sets for productions. Mostly he worked on private commissions for mural paintings in New York. Known interior designs made by him are in the American Swedish Historical Museum and the John Ericsson Room in the John Morton Memorial Building in Philadelphia, narthex ceiling of the First Swedish Baptist Church of New York and the Swedish Room at the University of Pittsburgh.

Nordmark also participated in several exhibitions, including one at the Brooklyn Museum in 1932 and another at the Delphic Studios in New York. He wrote the books Modern Methods and Techniques for Painting in Fresco and Secco (1947) and Course in Beginning Oil Painting (1960).

Nordmark died at the end of 1973 in France.

Teaching 

Although it is not known when Nordmark started to teach, it is possible that he had a summer art school at his studio in Lomala, Hopewell Junction, New York, already in the early 1930s. Among his first known students were Reginald Marsh and Elsa Jemne. In 1934 Marsh traveled to Lomala to learn the art of fresco painting from Nordmark, in anticipation of his commission to execute murals. He stayed for about six months with Nordmark studying fresco techniques. Marsh returned to Lomala in July 1935 with George Biddle to get extra training right before their mural projects in the Post Office Department Building in Washington, D.C. Jemne studied also fresco techniques with Nordmark at Lomala in preparation for future work in 1935.

Biddle and Marsh employed Nordmark to superintend their mural projects in the Post Office Department Building. Nordmark was involved with the project from around August 1935 to early 1936. In order that Nordmark would truly be able to superintend the project, Biddle hoped to induce Edward Bruce to give Nordmark some sort of work in Washington, D.C. It is possible that Nordmark was employed by the Resettlement Administration around October 1935. He served later as a technical consultant for the Section of Fine Art and supervised mural paintings made by Native American artists.

Biddle spent a summer studying fresco techniques with Nordmark, before he began his work in the Department of Justice Building in 1936. Like a year before, Nordmark was hired to supervise the mural projects of Biddle and Henry Varnum Poor. In 1937 Nordmark joined Marsh in New York City for the Custom House murals. Marsh had insisted on using fresco for the murals, despite objections from higher-ups. Nordmark worked also as a federal artist-in-residence in Pine Ridge Reservation in 1937, where Andrew Standing Soldier was studying under him.

The Department of the Interiors's Bureau of Indian Affairs employed Nordmark to teach fresco painting to Native Americans from 1938 to 1943. He was working at the Indian Art Center, a program for outstanding students and teachers, in Fort Sill, Oklahoma, from 1938 to 1940. In 1940 instructors and students from Phoenix Indian School, Phoenix, Arizona, traveled to Fort Sill to study under Nordmark. There is little known about the Indian Art Center. Some records of the program probably exist, but many may have been destroyed. According to Leonard Riddles the students were taught tempera painting, oil painting, fresco and secco.

Oscar Jacobson, director of University of Oklahoma art department and founder of the university's art museum, criticized Nordmark's teaching. Commissioner John Collier was forced to defend it. He replied that Nordmark taught only techniques and never dictated style, design or colors to his students. This was proved by the uniquely individualistic work of Standing Soldier, who was studying again with Nordmark at the Indian Art Center in circa 1938, and of the Native Americans, who painted murals in the Department of the Interior Building.

Among Nordmark's other known students at the Indian Art Center were
 Spencer Asah, James Auchiah, Stephen Mopope and Leonard Riddles in 1938,
 Archie Blackowl, Franklin Gritts, Cecil Murdock and Andrew Tsihnahjinnie in 1939,
 Allan Houser, Oscar Howe and Victor Pepion in 1940.

Blackbear Bosin, Woody Crumbo, Charles Loloma, Fred Kabotie and David E. Williams. studied also with Nordmark at the Indian Art Center, but more detailed information about their years of attendance have not been found. Gerald Nailor, Sr. studied with Nordmark in 1940, but the location is uncertain. According to literature he studied either privately in Oklahoma or Fort Sill Indian School, Lawton, Oklahoma. Some sources tells that Nailor enrolled with his close friend Houser for one year at the Fort Sill Indian School.

Nordmark was probably teaching at the Phoenix Indian School from 1941 to 1943. Among his students were Richard West from 1941 to 1942 and Patrick DesJarlait likely in 1942. George Smith "Woogee" Watchetaker and Herman Toppah studied also with Nordmark, but the references do not give any further information about neither the location nor the year. Later Jacobson and Nordmark mentored together some Philbrook artists including Crumbo, Albin Jake and Jesse Edwin Davis II.

Nordmark worked as advisor or supervisor for many mural painting projects. Some of the projects he supervised were made by
 Auchiah, Blackowl, Crumbo, Gritts, Mopope, Riddles at Fort Sill Indian School from 1939 to 1940,
 Auchiah, Crumbo, Herrera, Houser, Mopope, Nailor at Department of the Interior Building, Washington, D.C., from 1939 to 1940,
 Pepion at Museum of the Plains Indian, Browning, Montana in the summer of 1941.

Later life 

Nordmark never forgot his native locality. He donated 58 drawings and sketches to the local history society, Mockfjärd Hembygdsförening, in 1958. These works are frequently exhibited.

In 1964 Nordmark moved to Huningue, France, where he lived for the rest of his life. He is buried at a cemetery in Huningue.

Personal life 

In 1916 Nordmark got engaged to Ruth Granath, the daughter of a wealthy furnisher from Västerås. Granath broke off the engagement, after she fell in love with a Dane on a vacation to Hornbæk in Denmark. Nordmark had not been able to join her on the vacation, as he could not take off from work. He later married a Finnish artist, Hilja Elonen (November 16, 1888—April 22, 1963). After her death, Nordmark married a Swedish woman called Marie-Louise.

Artistic style 

Nordmark is known for his exquisitely beautiful colors, his original ideas and artistic taste. The lines and the colors in his theater decorations and costumes helped to create the most striking effects.

Notes

References

External links
 
 Photograph of Olle Nordmark
 Photograph of Olle Nordmark

1890 births
1973 deaths
20th-century Swedish painters
Swedish male painters
Muralists
20th-century Swedish male artists